Anatoliy Matkevych, (born 17 June 1977) is a Ukrainian football player who plays for FC Nyva Ternopil.

Matkevych played for MFC Mykolaiv during the 2010–11 Ukrainian First League season. Matkevych participated the 2007 AFC Champions League group stages with Al-Ittihad Aleppo.

References

External links

1977 births
Living people
Footballers from Dnipro
Ukrainian footballers
Ukrainian expatriate footballers
Association football midfielders
FC Dnipro players
FC Kryvbas Kryvyi Rih players
Al-Ittihad Aleppo players
FC Polissya Zhytomyr players
FC Nafkom Brovary players
SC Tavriya Simferopol players
FC Desna Chernihiv players
MFC Mykolaiv players
FC Nyva Ternopil players
Ukrainian expatriate sportspeople in Syria
Expatriate footballers in Syria
Syrian Premier League players